The Auersberg is a mountain, in the Rhön, that rises immediately north of Hilders. East of the wooded peak lies Simmershausen, a village in the municipality of Hilders, and to the north is Lahrbach, in the municipality of Tann (Rhön). On the southwestern slopes of the mountain are the ruins of Auersburg Castle. Like the western side of the peak these are on the Main-Werra Way, a tourist path managed by the Rhön Club. The Ulster flows past the Auersberg just to the west. The Auersberg near Hilders should not be confused with the Großer and Kleiner Auersberg near Wildflecken in the Bavarian part of the Rhön.

See also 
List of mountains and hills of the Rhön

References 

Mountains under 1000 metres
Mountains of Hesse
Mountains and hills of the Rhön